Bradford High School is a high school located in the town of Bradford in Gibson County, Tennessee.   It is a part of the Bradford Special School District and enrolls children in grades 6–12.

References

Public high schools in Tennessee
Education in Gibson County, Tennessee